The Philippines participated in the 1958 Asian Games held in Tokyo, Japan from May 24 to June 1, 1958.
The country ranked 2nd with 9 gold medals, 19 silver medals and 21 bronze medals. This edition of the Asiad has been the most fruitful for the Philippines in terms of the total number of medals garnered.

Asian Games performance
148 athletes participated and they joined in 12 sports. Inocencia Solis was crowned Asia's fastest woman with a 12.5 second clocking, she also won the silver medal as part of the 4x100 near relay squad of Rogelia Ferrer, Francisca Sanopal and Irene Penuela.

The basketball squad won its third consecutive Asian Cage title.

Medalists

Gold

Silver

Silver

Multiple

Medal summary

Medals by sports

References

Nations at the 1958 Asian Games
1958
Asian Games